Ningbo Railway Station is an underground metro station of Line 2 and Line 4 in Ningbo, Zhejiang, China. It situates under the station building of Ningbo Railway Station of China Railways. Passengers can transfer to intercity trains without going out of the station. Construction of the station started in late 2010, Line 2 station opened to service on September 26, 2015, and Line 4 station opened to service on December 23, 2020.

Exits 
Ningbo Railway Station has 2 exits on B1 floor of the China Railways station and 4 standalone exits.

References 

Railway stations in Zhejiang
Railway stations in China opened in 2015
Ningbo Rail Transit stations